Thomas McGrath (1891 – 31 May 1958) was an Irish hurler who played as a right corner-forward for the Limerick senior team.

Born in Limerick, McGrath first arrived on the inter-county scene at the age of twenty seven when he first linked up with the Limerick senior team. He made his senior debut in the 1918 championship. McGrath went on to play a key part for Limerick during a golden age for the team, and won two All-Ireland medals and three Munster medals. He was an All-Ireland runner-up on one occasion.

At club level McGrath won five championship medals with Claughaun.

Honours

Team

Young Irelands
Limerick Senior Hurling Championship (5): 1914, 1915, 1916, 1918, 1926

Limerick
All-Ireland Senior Hurling Championship (2): 1918, 1921
Munster Senior Hurling Championship (3): 1918, 1921, 1923

References

1891 births
1958 deaths
Claughaun hurlers
Limerick inter-county hurlers
All-Ireland Senior Hurling Championship winners